Dhuleta is a village in Phillaur tehsil of Jalandhar District of Punjab State, India. The village is administrated by a sarpanch who is an elected representative of village as per Panchayati raj (India).

Education 
The village has a Punjabi Medium, co-ed upper primary school (Gps Dhuleta School). The school provides mid-day meal and it was founded in 1952.

Transport

Rail 

Air 

References 

Villages in Jalandhar district
Villages in Phillaur tehsil